The 1964 Brabantse Pijl was the fourth edition of the Brabantse Pijl cycle race and was held on 1 April 1964. The race started and finished in  Brussels. The race was won by Arnaldo Pambianco.

General classification

References

1963
Brabantse Pijl